The Battle of Salineville occurred July 26, 1863, near Salineville, Ohio, during Morgan's Raid in the American Civil War. It was the northernmost military action involving an official command of the Confederate States Army. The Union victory shattered John Hunt Morgan's remaining Confederate cavalry, and led to his capture later that day.

Background
In June 1863, Confederate Brig. Gen. John Hunt Morgan departed his camp in Tennessee on a raid with 2,460 troopers, intending to divert the attention of the Union Army of the Ohio from Southern forces in the state. On July 8, 1863, Morgan crossed the Ohio River at Brandenburg, Kentucky, and entered Indiana, in violation of his orders to remain in Kentucky.  After a victory at the Battle of Corydon, Morgan proceeded eastward into Ohio, pursued by Federal troops under Brig. Gen. James M. Shackelford. On July 19, Morgan attempted to cross the Ohio River into West Virginia at Buffington Island, upriver from Pomeroy in Meigs County, Ohio. Some of his men did make it across the river and back to the South. However, Union forces under Brig. Gens. Edward H. Hobson and Henry M. Judah captured an estimated 800 – 1,200 of Morgan's force, while some 300 under Col. Adam "Stovepipe" Johnson managed to cross upriver.

General Morgan and the remaining 400 men of his command escaped, cut off from the river crossings. When another attempt to ford the river failed, he headed north, eventually reaching Columbiana County, still hoping to cross the Ohio River at some point and head back to the South. His route took him through a number of terrified villages, including Moorefield, Harrisville, New Athens, Smithfield, New Alexandria, Wintersville, Two Ridge, Richmond, East Springfield, Bergholz, and Monroeville (Jefferson County). With his horses playing out and his men emotionally and physically exhausted, Morgan trudged northward while his pursuers blocked attempts to reach the river.

The battle and Morgan's surrender

Union General Shackelford continued in pursuit of Morgan, leading a mixed command of cavalry, artillery, and mounted infantry from Illinois, Kentucky, West Virginia, Tennessee, Michigan and Ohio, as well as the Steubenville Militia. Morgan's weary men were isolated, under constant pursuit, and heading deeper into enemy territory. Eventually, Morgan was flanked and cut off by Union forces on July 26, 1863 at Salineville, near Lisbon, Ohio. Badly outnumbered, Morgan attempted to cut his way out from the estimated 3,000 Federals. He lost 364 men (including 23 dead, several wounded, and nearly 300 captured) in a firefight that lasted no more than an hour and a half. Remarkably, General Morgan and a small number of his men initially managed to elude capture. However, at 2:00 p.m., they surrendered to Union Maj. George W. Rue of the 9th Kentucky Cavalry near West Point, Ohio approximately 8 miles northeast of Salineville. Today, a historical marker commemorates the location of the surrender (40° 41.833′ N, 80° 44.633′ W).

Major Rue later reported that General Morgan, upon first seeing the Major and his troops approaching, surrendered to one of his own prisoners, an Ohio Militia captain named Burbridge, who then immediately paroled Morgan and his fellow officers, an act that would have allowed them to return home to Kentucky as noncombatants. Rue disregarded that "surrender" and insisted that Morgan formally surrender to the Union forces, ignoring the paroles. Troops escorted Morgan to Columbus, Ohio, where he and many of his officers were imprisoned in the Ohio Penitentiary. Many of his captured soldiers were sent to Camp Chase and other prisoner of war camps in the North.

In July and August 1863 Ohio Governor David Tod led an inquiry into Morgan's surrender.  Governor Tod concluded that Captain Burbridge was actually James Burbick, a private citizen of New Lisbon, Ohio, who had never served as an officer in the Ohio Militia.  As such, Governor Tod ruled that he had no authority over Morgan, and that Morgan’s surrender to Union forces stood.

Superlative dispute

Another Confederate action, the St. Albans Raid, was farther north than the Battle of Salineville. On October 19, 1864, 21 Confederates slipped southward from Canada and raided St. Albans, Vermont. However, the Vermont raiders were not an official command of the Confederate army; historians connect the St. Albans raid to the Confederate Secret Service. General Morgan’s place of surrender at West Point is considered to be the northernmost point reached by an officially organized Confederate body during the Civil War.

See also

 John H. Morgan Surrender Site

Notes

Further reading

External links
 National Park Service Biography of John Hunt Morgan
 Map of Morgan's route
 Ohio Department of Natural Resources: Morgan's Raid
 Mahoning Valley Civil War Round Table: Summary of Morgan's Raid
 Major Rue's account of Morgan's surrender
 Heidelberg College: Photograph of the site of Morgan’s place of surrender
 Heidelberg College: Photograph of the plaque marking Morgan's place of surrender
 Civil War Sites Advisory Commission Report Update
 Summary of Morgan's Raid by the Carnegie Public Library of East Liverpool, Ohio

1863 in Ohio
Conflicts in 1863
Morgan's Raid
Columbiana County, Ohio
Carroll County, Ohio
Battles of the Western Theater of the American Civil War
Union victories of the American Civil War
Battles of the American Civil War in Ohio
July 1863 events